Leptogorgia exigua is a coral species first described by Addison Emery Verrill in 1870. Verrill initially considered this species a diminutive variant of L. cuspidata, but ultimately decided to consider L. exigua a separate species. It is native to the Pacific Ocean.

References

Gorgoniidae
Cnidarians of the Pacific Ocean
Animals described in 1870
Taxa named by Addison Emery Verrill